Feel Good Now is an EP by American musician The Ready Set. It was released on October 7, 2011 following the release of his major album I'm Alive, I'm Dreaming. The EP includes 3 singles, "Young Forever", "Hollywood Dream" and "Killer".

Singles
"Young Forever" was released on March 1, 2011 as the first single from the EP. The song peaked at number 39 on the Billboard Mainstream Top 40 chart and number 5 on its Bubbling Under Hot 100 chart. "Hollywood Dream" was released on August 19, 2011 as the second single from the EP. He described the single as, "a story about being a kid from a small town with a simple life, who falls in love with a famous, Beverly Hills-style girl." On September 27, 2011, "Killer" was released as the third single. He explains the song as, "knowing you are not the type of person somebody should be in a relationship with, and sort of warning them to stay away."

Days prior to the release of Feel Good Now, "Back to Back" and "A Little More" were released as a promotional singles.

Critical reception

Feel Good Now was given a 3.5 star rating by AllMusic, and in its review by Tim Sendra, he calls it an "even more assured-sounding, extremely well-crafted pop." However he criticized the EP stating, "The only downside of the record, and the band itself, is that they are hard to slot into any one style -- too pop for emo, too emo for pop -- and this may affect their sales." Evan Lucy of Alternative Press was critical of the EP stating, "there’s not much diversity, something a sound like Witzigreuter’s sorely needs."

Track listing

Personnel
Credits for Feel Good Now adapted from AllMusic.

 Jordan Witzigreuter - composer
 Kate Cafaro - publicity
 The Cataracs - producer
 David Conway - management
 Kara DioGuardi - composer
 Greg Federspiel - A&R
 Jeff Fenster - A&R
 Scott Frost - product manager
 Matt Galle - booking
 Brian Gardner - mastering
 Dirk Hemsath - management
 Niles Hollowell-Dhar - composer, engineer

 Ian Kirkpatrick - composer, mixing, producer
 TJ Landig - marketing
 Ari Levine - mixing
 Liz Lewis - marketing, video
 Mike Marquis - booking
 Laura Mende - marketing, video
 Tim Pagnotta - composer, engineer, producer, vocal producer
 Evan Perigo - photography
 Justin Smith - mastering
 Alex Tenta - design, layout
 Jonna Terrasi - A&R
 Pete Wentz - A&R

Charts

References

2011 EPs
The Ready Set albums